Ricardo Luiz Zonta (born March 23, 1976) is a Brazilian professional racing driver. He currently competes full-time in the Brazilian Stock Car Pro Series, driving the No. 10 Toyota Corolla E210 for RCM Motorsport.

Early career
Born in Curitiba, Brazil, Zonta began karting in 1987, winning his first race shortly thereafter. The following year, he was runner-up for the Curitiba Karting Championship, and in 1991, he won the title. He continued karting until 1992, finishing fourth in the São Paulo Karting Championship before progressing to single-seaters for 1993. He finished 6th in the Brazilian Formula Chevrolet Championship, and then in 1994, came fifth in the Brazilian Formula Three Championship. A year later, Zonta won both the Brazilian and South American Formula Three Championships.

Moving to Europe in 1996, Zonta competed in the International Formula 3000 Championship for Draco Racing, winning two races and finishing fourth overall. In the same year, he became the first Brazilian to compete in International Touring Cars, with Mercedes. In 1997, he won three races and the Formula 3000 championship. He also took home the "Golden Helmet" award for best international driver for his efforts. The Jordan Formula One team signed him as their official test driver following his championship, and in 1998, he was signed by McLaren boss Ron Dennis. Zonta tested with the McLaren Formula One team in 1998, and concurrently won the FIA GT Championship (GT1 class) and the "Golden Helmet" award in the "world prominence" category.

In October 1998, immediately after winning the FIA GT championship, Zonta signed up with the B.A.R. Formula One racing team as one of its race drivers for the 1999 season, after rejecting offers from Jordan and Sauber.

Formula One career

In 1999, Zonta started as a Formula One racing driver alongside 1997 World Champion Jacques Villeneuve at new team BAR. He injured his foot in an accident during practice for the Brazilian Grand Prix, and was forced to miss three races. He also had a large accident at Spa-Francorchamps, and finished the season with no championship points. Zonta remained with BAR for the 2000 season, scoring his first world championship point with a sixth place in the opening race. He had another large accident when his front suspension broke during testing at Silverstone, but continued the season, scoring points in both the Italian and United States Grands Prix, to finish 14th in the championship. Replaced by Olivier Panis for the 2001 season, Zonta became the third driver for the Jordan team, replacing the injured Heinz-Harald Frentzen for one race, and then again when Frentzen was sacked, but was overlooked to replace him for the remainder of the season.

In 2002, he decided to focus on the Telefónica World Series, which he won. Zonta was then hired as test driver for the Toyota F1 team in 2003, retaining the position in 2004. Toward the end of the season, the team sacked Cristiano da Matta from a race seat, and Zonta drove in four Grands Prix. In Belgium, he was running in fourth place three laps from the finish when his engine failed. In Suzuka the team hired Jarno Trulli and Zonta had to sit the event out, but the team allowed him to compete in his home race, the Brazilian Grand Prix, which he finished in 13th. He continued as a test driver for Toyota in 2005, alongside veteran French pilot Olivier Panis. At the US Grand Prix later that year, he stood in for the injured Ralf Schumacher and took his place on the grid, only for Toyota, like the other six Michelin-shod teams, to withdraw from the race due to safety concerns. 2006 saw Zonta continue with Toyota as the team's third and test driver. He was confirmed as test driver for the Renault Formula One team for the 2007 season on 6 September 2006.

After Formula One
In 2007, Zonta entered the Stock Car Brasil series in parallel with the work for the Renault team. In 2008, he contested the 24 Hours of Le Mans with Peugeot Sport, driving the #9 car alongside Franck Montagny and Formula One tester Christian Klien. He is also driving in the Grand Am Championship in America with Krohn Racing, while also being the team owner and driver of Panasonic Racing in Stock Car Brasil.

Racing career

Complete International Formula 3000 results
(key) (Races in bold indicate pole position) (Races in italics indicate fastest lap)

24 Hours of Le Mans results

Complete Formula One results
(key)

 Driver did not finish the Grand Prix, but was classified as they had completed over 90% of the race distance.

Complete Stock Car Brasil results

† Driver did not finish the race, but was classified as he completed over 90% of the race distance.

FIA GT Championship results

GT1 World Championship results

FIA GT Series results

References

External links 

 
 

1976 births
Living people
Sportspeople from Curitiba
Brazilian racing drivers
Brazilian Formula One drivers
Brazilian expatriates in Monaco
Brazilian expatriates in the United States
International Formula 3000 Champions
International Formula 3000 drivers
Formula 3 Sudamericana drivers
24 Hours of Le Mans drivers
Stock Car Brasil drivers
FIA GT Championship drivers
BAR Formula One drivers
Jordan Formula One drivers
Toyota Formula One drivers
24 Hours of Daytona drivers
FIA GT1 World Championship drivers
Rolex Sports Car Series drivers
Porsche Supercup drivers
TC 2000 Championship drivers
Brazilian Formula Three Championship drivers
Súper TC 2000 drivers
Mercedes-AMG Motorsport drivers
Super Nova Racing drivers
Peugeot Sport drivers
Draco Racing drivers